Jewelry district may refer to:
 a diamond district
 Jewelry District (Los Angeles), United States
 Jewelry District (Providence), Rhode Island, United States

See also
 Jewellery
 Jewellery Quarter, Birmingham, England